John Robinson (born 1840, date of death unknown) was a United States Navy sailor and a recipient of the United States military's highest decoration, the Medal of Honor.

A native of Cuba, Robinson joined the Navy from the U.S. state of Maine. On that day, he and another man, Acting Ensign James H. Bunting, swam ashore during a storm in Pensacola Bay to aid their ship. For this action, Robinson was awarded the Medal of Honor a month later, on February 23.

Robinson's official Medal of Honor citation reads:
With Acting Ensign James H. Bunting, during the heavy gale which occurred in Pensacola Bay on the night of 19 January 1867, Robinson swam ashore with a line for the purpose of sending off a blowcock, which would facilitate getting up steam and prevent the vessel from stranding, thus voluntarily periling his life to save the vessel and the lives of others.

See also

List of Medal of Honor recipients during peacetime

References

External links

1840 births
Year of death missing
Cuban emigrants to the United States
United States Navy sailors
United States Navy Medal of Honor recipients
Foreign-born Medal of Honor recipients
Non-combat recipients of the Medal of Honor